Mustafa Ethem Erboğa (born 11 January 1999) is a Turkish professional footballer who plays as a forward for Büyükçekmece Tepecikspor on loan from Kasımpaşa.

Professional career
Erboğa begun his senior career on loan with Kızılcabölükspor from Kasımpaşa on 29 January 2018. Erboğa made his professional debut for Kasımpaşa for Alanyaspor on 23 September 2018.

References

External links
 
 
 

1999 births
People from Orta
Living people
Turkish footballers
Turkey youth international footballers
Association football forwards
Kasımpaşa S.K. footballers
24 Erzincanspor footballers
1461 Trabzon footballers
Şanlıurfaspor footballers
Tepecikspor footballers
Süper Lig players
TFF Second League players
TFF Third League players